The Cher Show is a jukebox musical with a book by Rick Elice that tells the story of the life and career of Cher, using songs that she performed throughout her career. The part of Cher is played by three actresses: one portraying her in the 1950s and 60s (nicknamed "Babe"), one for the 1970s (nicknamed "Lady"), and one for the 1980s and 90s (nicknamed "Star"). The three interact with each other and help each other out at various points.

The musical had its world premiere at the Oriental Theatre, Chicago, on June 12, 2018, and opened on Broadway in December 2018. The Original Cast Album was released on digital platforms on April 12, 2019, and was released to physical CD on May 10, 2019. The Cher Show played its final Broadway performance on August 18, 2019. An overhauled production launched at the Leicester Curve in April 2022, before embarking on a UK tour.

Original Broadway production 
The Cher Show made its world premiere at the Oriental Theatre in Chicago, Illinois on June 12, 2018, and officially opened its out of town try-out on June 28 and ran until July 14. The final performance experienced technical difficulties and forced the show to close one day early, on July 14 (Instead of July 15), 2018. Following its Chicago run, the musical began previews on Broadway on November 1, 2018, and officially opened on December 3, 2018, at the Neil Simon Theatre.

The musical's book is by Rick Elice, direction by Jason Moore, choreography by Christopher Gattelli, and orchestrations, arrangements and musical supervision by Daryl Waters and additional orchestrations by Steve Orich. Cher's longtime costumer Bob Mackie is the costume designer, with set designers Christine Jones and Brett J. Banakis, lighting designer Kevin Adams, and sound designer Nevin Steinberg. The producers of the show are Jeffrey Seller, Flody Suarez and Cher.

The Cher Show won Tony Awards for Stephanie J. Block (Lead Actress in a Musical) and for Bob Mackie (Costume Design for a Musical).

The Cher Show ended its run on Broadway on August 18, 2019, having played 34 previews and 296 regular performances. A touring production was announced to premiere in 2021 after the original launch date of October 2020 in Rochester, New York was postponed due to the COVID-19 pandemic. However, as of August 2022, the tour has yet to begin.

2022/2023 UK tour 
In May 2021, a new touring production was announced in the UK and Ireland from April 2022 to April 2023 directed by Arlene Phillips and featuring choreography from Oti Mabuse. Casting for the tour will include Millie O'Connell as Babe, Danielle Steers as Lady and Debbie Kurup as Star. The show will differ from the Broadway production with modifications to the show's music, Rick Elice's book, and the costumes; which will be redesigned by Gabriella Slade (Six). It also has set design by Tom Rogers, lighting design by Ben Cracknell, sound design by Dan Samson, wigs, hair and make-up design by Sam Cox, music production by Gary Hickeson, musical supervision by Rich Morris.

Principal Casts

 Role changed to solely Bob Mackie for UK/Ireland tour
 Characters combined into single role of Gregg Allman/Rob Camilletti/Phil Spector/John Southall for UK/Ireland tour
 Role changed to solely Georgia Holt for UK/Ireland tour

Musical numbers

Broadway production

Act I
"If I Could Turn Back Time" – Star and Company
"Half-Breed" – Georgia Holt, Star, and Lady
"A Dream Is A Wish Your Heart Makes" – Georgia Holt and Babe †
"You Better Sit Down Kids" – Georgia Holt †
"Be My Baby/Da Doo Ron Ron (Phil Spector Medley)" – Babe, Phil Spector, Sonny and Company †
"The Shoop Shoop Song (It's in His Kiss)" – Star, Lady, Babe and Company
"I Like It Like That" – The Dave Clark Five †
"I Got You Babe" – Babe and Sonny
"Little Man" – Babe and Sonny †
"When the Money's Gone / All or Nothing" – Lady, Babe, Sonny and Company
"VAMP" – Star †
"Ain't Nobody's Business If I Do" – Star, Lady, Babe, Bob and Company
"Living in a House Divided" – Star, Lady, Babe and Sonny
"Bang Bang (My Baby Shot Me Down)" – Star, Lady and Company
"Believe" – Star, Lady and Babe
"Song for the Lonely" – Star, Lady and Babe

Act II
"All I Ever Need Is You" – Lady and Sonny
"Heart of Stone" – Lady and Lucille Ball 
"Gypsies, Tramps and Thieves" – Star and Company
"Midnight Rider / Ramblin' Man" – Gregg Allman
"Just Like Jesse James" – Star, Gregg Allman and Company
"Dark Lady" – Sonny and Gregg Allman
"Baby Don't Go" – Sonny †
"Strong Enough" – Star and Lady
"The Way of Love" – Star
"The Beat Goes On" – Star, Babe, Bob Mackie, Bob Mackie's Assistant and Company
"I Found Someone" – Star, Rob Camiletti and Company
"You Haven't Seen the Last of Me" – Star, Lady and Babe
"Finale" ("Believe"/"Strong Enough"/"Woman's World"/"All Or Nothing"/"You Haven’t Seen The Last of Me") – Star, Lady, Babe and Company
"Take Me Home (Curtain Call)" – Company †
† Not featured on Original Broadway Cast Recording

2022 UK Tour

Songs listed as they appear in the official set list.

Act I
"Believe" – Company
"If I Could Turn Back Time" – Star and Company
"Half-Breed" – Georgia Holt and Babe
"A Dream Is A Wish Your Heart Makes" – Babe, Georgia and Star
"You Better Sit Down Kid" – Georgia
"Half Breed (Reprise)" – Lady, Babe and Star
"Da Doo Ron Ron" – Babe, Star, Lady and Company
"Be My Baby" – Company
"The Shoop Shoop Song (It's in His Kiss)" – Babe, Star, Lady and Company
"I Got You Babe" – Babe and Sonny
"Little Man" – Sonny
"When the Money's Gone / All or Nothing" – Babe, Sonny, Star, Lady and Company
"VAMP" – Lady, Babe and Star
"Ain't Nobody's Business If I Do" Bob Mackie, Lady, Babe, Star and Company
"Bang Bang" – Lady
"Living in a House Divided" – Star, Babe, Lady and Sonny
"Bang Bang (Reprise)" – Lady, Star, Babe and Company
"Believe" – Star, Lady, and Babe
"All I Ever Need Is You" – Lady and Sonny
"Song for the Lonely" – Star, Lady, and Babe

Act II
"Gypsies, Tramps and Thieves" – Star and Company
"Midnight Rider" – Gregg Allman
"Just Like Jesse James" – Star, Gregg and Company
"Believe (Reprise)" – Lady and Babe
"Dark Lady" – Star, Sonny, Gregg and Company
"Baby Don't Go" – Sonny
"Strong Enough" – Star, Lady and Babe
"The Way of Love" – Star
"The Beat Goes On" – Star, Babe, Bob, Lady and Company
"Dov'è L'amore" – Star and Company
"I Found Someone" – Lady and Star
"A Different Kind of Love Song" – Rob Camiletti, Star and Georgia
"Heart of Stone" – Star
"We All Sleep Alone" (removed August 2022) – Lady
"Song for the Lonely" (Reprise) (added August 2022) – Lady 
"I Got You Babe (Reprise)" – Star and Sonny
"You Haven't Seen the Last of Me" – Star, Babe and Lady
"A Dream is a Wish Your Heart Makes (Reprise)" – Star and Georgia

Finale (Medley comprising, in order, "Believe", "Strong Enough", "Woman's World", "Dov'è L'amore", "The Shoop Shoop Song (It's in His Kiss)", "I Found Someone", and "Believe".)

Awards and nominations

Original Broadway production

References

External links
Internet Broadway Database

Official UK & Ireland Tour Website

2018 musicals
Biographical musicals
Biographical plays about musicians
Broadway musicals
Cher
Jukebox musicals
Plays set in the 20th century
Tony Award-winning musicals